The Bishop of Repton is an episcopal title used by a suffragan bishop of the Church of England Diocese of Derby, in the Province of Canterbury, England. The title takes its name after Repton, a large village in Derbyshire; the See was erected under the Suffragans Nomination Act 1888 by Order in Council dated 18 May 1965.

List of bishops

References

External links
 Crockford's Clerical Directory - Listings

Bishops of Repton
Anglican suffragan bishops in the Diocese of Derby
Diocese of Derby